Ispronicline (TC-1734, AZD-3480) is an experimental  drug which acts as a partial agonist at neural nicotinic acetylcholine receptors. It progressed to phase II clinical trials for the treatment of dementia and Alzheimer's disease, but is no longer under development. 

It has also progressed to phase II as a potential treatment for ADHD. With dosages of 50mg day showing a significant improvement in ADHD symptoms

Ispronicline is subtype-selective, binding primarily to the α4β2 subtype. It has antidepressant, nootropic and neuroprotective effects.

Early stage clinical trials showed that ispronicline was well tolerated, with the main side effects being dizziness and headache. However, mid stage clinical trials failed to show sufficient efficacy to continue development as a pharmaceutical drug.

See also 
 Rivanicline

References 

Nootropics
Pyridines
Nicotinic agonists
Stimulants
Ethers
Amines
Isopropyl compounds
Alkene derivatives